Sahyadria is a genus of cyprinid fishes native to India where they are endemic to rivers and streams in the Western Ghats. They were formerly included in Puntius. The largest Sahyadria measure  total length.

Etymology
The name of this genus is derived from the word "Sahyadri", a local name for the Western Ghats.

Species
There are currently two recognized species in this genus:
 Sahyadria chalakkudiensis (Menon, Rema Devi & Thobias, 1999)
 Sahyadria denisonii (F. Day, 1865) – Denison barb; red line torpedo barb

References

 
Cyprinidae genera
Freshwater fish of Asia
Endemic fauna of the Western Ghats
Taxa named by Rajeev Raghavan
Taxa named by Siby Philip Mukkadan
Taxa named by Palakkaparambil Hamsa Anver Ali 
Taxa named by Neelesh Dahanukar